Unwilling to Explain is the fourth album by American improvisational band Unknown Instructors, featuring Mike Watt (The Minutemen, fIREHOSE), George Hurley (Minutemen, fIREHOSE), J Mascis (Dinosaur Jr.), and Dan McGuire.

It was the first Unknown Instructors album that wasn't improvised and the first to feature Mascis on guitar instead of Baiza. The recording took quite some time with Watt recording bass tracks in 2011 and Hurley laying down the drums the following year. Mascis' guitar work was recorded three years after that with Dan McGuire's vocals following.

Reception
David Arnson of Music Connection called it "truly interesting" but warned "Your mileage may vary on the Tom Waits- and Bukowski-influenced bop narration. The real take- away is Mascis’ fluid and expressive guitar work." Razorcake's Michael T. Fournier praised it saying it "hangs together better than any of the group’s other records I’ve heard." Mark Hughson of Jersey Beat said "If you’re into on-the-fly jazz rock you’ll be hard pressed to find better indie star power."

Personnel
Mike Watt - bass
George Hurley - drums
J Mascis - guitar
Dan McGuire - vocals 
Joe Baiza - vocals
Stephen Haluska - harp 
Leah Jenssen - cello 
Dan Wenninger - saxophone

Production
Dave Gardner - Mastering
Mike Watt - Producer 
Dan McGuire - Producer

References

External links
Unwilling to Explain at Bandcamp

Unknown Instructors albums
2019 albums